Quercus × alvordiana, the Alvord oak, is a hybrid oak in the genus Quercus. It has been reported to be a hybrid between Quercus douglasii and Quercus turbinella, or between Q. douglasii and Quercus john-tuckeri, which was formerly considered to be a variety of Q. turbinella.

Distribution
This is the most common hybrid of Q. douglasii. It is endemic to California, where it occurs in the Southern Inner California Coast Ranges and western Transverse Ranges.

Description

The leaves are up to 5 centimeters long, a dull blue to gray-green on top and paler green on the undersides. The leaf blades have toothed edges and some have pointed tips.

The acorn is narrow in shape and up to 4 centimeters long, with a cup up to 1.6 centimeters wide.

Notes

alvordiana
Endemic flora of California
Hybrid plants
Natural history of the California chaparral and woodlands
Natural history of the California Coast Ranges
Natural history of the Transverse Ranges